Aleksandre (Aleko) Elisashvili (born 17 January 1978) is a Georgian political figure who has served in the Parliament of Georgia since 2020.

Elisashvili started his political career as an activist within a civic preservation group. He was an independent member of the Tbilisi city assembly until 2017, when he was an independent candidate in the Tbilisi Mayoral Elections. He took second place with 69,803 votes (17.4%). He is  the chairman of the "Aleko Elisashvili – Citizens" party.

In 2022, responding to the Russian invasion of Ukraine, he volunteered for the International Legion of Territorial Defense of Ukraine.

Biography
 International Legion of Territorial Defense of Ukraine (2022–present)
 Party "Aleko Elisashvili-Citizens", Chair (2020–present)
 "Civil Movement of Georgia", Chair (2018–2020)
 State Pardon Commission, Chair (2013–2014)
 Tbilisi City Assembly, Independent Single Mandate Member (2014–2017)
 Caucasus, journalist (2008–2016)
 Maestro, journalist (2007–2009)
 Union of Guardians of Tiflis, "Tiflis Guild", Chair (2006–2012)
 Channel 9, news correspondent (2004–2007)
 Radio Liberty, journalist (2004–2007)

References

External links
 His biography on site of Parliament of Georgia

1978 births
Living people
Members of the Parliament of Georgia
21st-century politicians from Georgia (country)
International Legion of Territorial Defense of Ukraine personnel
Foreign volunteers in the 2022 Russian invasion of Ukraine